Asociația Fotbal Club Astra Giurgiu is a Romanian professional football club based in Giurgiu, Giurgiu County. The club have participated in 4 editions of the club competitions governed by UEFA, three in Europa League and one in Champions League. In 2013–14 season, they managed to qualify for the group stages of Europa League for the first time, after defeating French giants Olympique Lyon; they finished fourth in a group against Red Bull Salzburg, Celtic, and Dinamo Zagreb. In 2014–15, they knocked out English side West Ham United, after 2–2 at London and 2–1 at Giurgiu.

In 2015–16 Liga I the club managed to win the title for the first time in their history; that meant qualification to the 2015–16 UEFA Champions League third qualifying round. The club drew FC København, and couldn't manage to win the tie after drawing 1–1 in Giurgiu and losing 0–3 in Copenhagen against the Danish team.

In the Europa League play-off Astra was drawn against English side West Ham United and managed to eliminate them for the second successive season, by winning 1–0 at the Olympic Stadium after having drawn 1–1 at home.

After qualifying, the club was seeded in Group E against AS Roma, Viktoria Plzen, and Austria Wien. Astra managed to come second after a tight group and qualified for the round of 32 where they played against Belgian side KRC Genk.

All-time statistics

Opponents

History of matches 

Notes for the abbreviations in the tables below:

 1QR: First qualifying round
 2QR: Second qualifying round
 3QR: Third qualifying round
 PO: Play-off round
 R32: Round of 32

Top scorers

External links
 UEFA website

Romanian football clubs in international competitions
FC Astra Giurgiu